The 2007 World Juniors and Cadets Fencing Championships was held in Belek, Antalya, Turkey between April 10 to April 18, 2007. The event, an organization of the Federation Internationale d'Escrime (FIE), was carried out by the Turkish Fencing Federation (TEF). Junior and cadet fencers from 53 countries competed in the categories foil, épée and sabre in the championship. Russia was the most successful nation, followed by Ukraine and Italy.

Venue
Belek, a town in Antalya Province, is one of the most prominent centers of Turkey's tourism. The competitions took place in Maritim Pine Beach Hotel, aka Belek Convention Center.

Medal table

References

Junior World Fencing Championships
W
World 2007
World Juniors and Cadets Fencing Championships
Sport in Antalya
21st century in Antalya
Youth sport in Turkey